Beramanja is a town and commune in Madagascar. It belongs to the district of Ambilobe, which is a part of Diana Region. According to 2001 commune census the population of Beramanja was 26,273.

Beramanja has a riverine harbour. Primary and junior level secondary education are available in town. The majority of the population 58% works in fishing. 37% are farmers, while an additional 3% receives their livelihood from raising livestock. The most important crop is coffee, while other important products are maize, sweet potatoes and rice.  Industry and services provide both employment for 1% of the population.

References and notes 

Populated places in Diana Region